Luiz Carlos de Castro Tourinho Filho (16 May 1964 in Niterói – 21 January 2008 in Niterói) was a Brazilian actor.

Tourinho gained notoriety on TV with the role of Franco in the series "Sob Nova Direção", in which he played opposite actresses Ingrid Guimarães and Heloísa Périssé.

He died of a cerebral aneurysm at the age of 43 after being rushed to the Hospital de Clínicas de Niterói in Niterói, Brazil.

Filmography

Film
1988: Super Xuxa contra o Baixo Astral - Pássaro-gente Tic
1990: Assim na Tela Como no Céu - Lúcifer Júnior
1994: Era Uma Vez... - Banshee
1997: For All - O Trampolim da Vitória - Sandoval
2000: Tainá - Uma Aventura na Amazônia - Smith
2002: Xuxa e os Duendes 2 - Chuchu
2004: Xuxa e o Tesouro da Cidade Perdida - Curupira

Television
1984: A Principal causa do Divórcio (Caso Verdade)
1989: O Cometa - Miguel
1990: Escolinha do Professor Raimundo - Pedro Vaz Caminha
1993: Você Decide - "Sinuca de Bico"
1996-1997: Chico Total
1996: Caça Talentos - Fred
1998: Era Uma Vez - Banshee
1999: Suave Veneno - Edilberto
2000: Sai de Baixo - Ataíde
2001: Gente Inocente
2003: Xuxa no Mundo da Imaginação
2003: Kubanacan - Jack Everest
2003-2004: Sob Nova Direção - Franco
2003: Sítio do Picapau Amarelo - Mefisto
2005-2007: Sob Nova Direção - Franco
2007-2008: Desejo Proibido - Nezinho (final appearance)

References

External links 

1964 births
2008 deaths
Brazilian male telenovela actors
Deaths from intracranial aneurysm
Brazilian male film actors